Monte Priaforà is a mountain of the Veneto, Italy. It has an elevation of 1,659 metres. It is part of the Little Dolomites with Cima Palon (the highest peak).

Mountains of the Alps
Mountains of Veneto